Peeter Baranin (or Pjotr Baranin; 31 January 1882, Kolkja – 11 April 1966, Tallinn) was an Estonian politician.

Baranin studied at Tartu Reaalkool. He was a firefighter. He was also the mayor of Mustvee and the chairman of the gentry board. He was a member of the Riigikogu from 1923 to 1929.

He was chairman of the Kolkja branch of Old Believers until 1914. He had established a new Old Believer church in Kolkja in 1928.

Baranin died on 11 April 1966 in Tallinn and was buried on 13 April 1966 at Metsakalmistu.

References 

1882 births
1966 deaths
People from Peipsiääre Parish
People from Kreis Dorpat
Old Believers
Estonian people of Russian descent
Members of the Riigikogu, 1923–1926
Members of the Riigikogu, 1926–1929
Burials at Metsakalmistu